Jamaica Chamber of Commerce Building is a historic office building located in the Jamaica section of the New York City borough of Queens.  It was designed in 1928 by George W. Conable (1866-1933) and is a ten-story, "T" shaped building in the Colonial Revival style.

History
On May 23, 1919, the Jamaica Chamber of Commerce (originally called the Jamaica Board of Trade) was conceived and established at a meeting 17 civic-minded businessmen and community leaders and incorporated. The purpose of this meeting was to promote the development Jamaica as a residential community and commercial center.

By the mid 1920s, the Board expanded and moved Jamaica Avenue further out to the Stuart Building between 163rd and 164th Streets. During this time, the growth of greater Jamaica was significant and new residential developments were constructed; the development of these residential districts caused the business district to expand. In July 1927, the Board of Trade changed its organization's name to the Jamaica Chamber of Commerce in order to reflect the organization's "broader scope" of interests. A committee spent a year considering the construction and establishment of a building specifically for the Chamber of Commerce; the first idea for this new building was suggested by Secretary Max C. Bunyan. He suggested that in order to improve the work of the organization, "A building of its own, properly equipped, would be a big help towards making the Jamaica Board of Trade 100 percent efficient and ...that such a building could be erected, a part of it being set aside from offices and other business purposes, and that it could be operated at a profit to the organization."

In August 1928, George W. Conable submitted plans for a ten-story office building with a commercial ground floor, which included seven stories of rentable office space, as well as two stories reserved specifically for the offices, meeting and dining rooms of the Chamber of Commerce. The construction of this structure commenced in October 1928. On May 20, 1929, the building was dedicated; the Long Island Daily Press praised it as "a decided asset to the community, and a building that can hold its own in an architectural beauty contest."

Design and style
George W. Conable designed this building with a distinctive facade based on 19th-century American and British precedents. It is a steel frame building faced in red brick and trimmed in stone and terra cotta detail.  It has tripartite massing with a one-story terra cotta base, six story section, and stepped back eighth and ninth stories.  The top story is a one-story pedimented temple.

It was listed on the National Register of Historic Places in 1983.

See also
List of New York City Designated Landmarks in Queens
National Register of Historic Places listings in Queens County, New York

References

1928 establishments in New York City
Colonial Revival architecture in New York City
Commercial buildings completed in 1928
Commercial buildings in Queens, New York
Jamaica, Queens
National Register of Historic Places in Queens, New York
New York City Designated Landmarks in Queens, New York
Office buildings on the National Register of Historic Places in New York City